Here is a list of French newsreaders and journalists:

A–D

 Paul Amar
 Adolphe Amouroux
 Rachid Arhab
 Marie-Laure Augry
 Francois Bachy
 Philippe Baqué
 Dominique Baudis
Jacqueline Baudrier
 Daniel Bilalian
 Jacqueline Caurat
 Arlette Chabot
 Robert Chapatte 
 Claire Chazal
 Michèle Cotta
 Georges de Caunes
 Ladislas de Hoyos
 Laurent Delahousse
 Michel Denisot
 Camille Desmoulins
 Clotilde Dissard
 Camille Drevet
 Michel Droit
 Marie Drucker
 Benoît Duquesne
 Guillaume Durand

E-L

 Jean-Pierre Elkabbach
 Louise Faure-Favier
 Laurence Ferrari
 Carole Gaessler
 Roger Gicquel
 Gérard Holtz
 Christophe Hondelatte
 Thomas Hugues
 Françoise Laborde
 Philippe Labro
 Anne-Sophie Lapix
 Yvette Lebas-Guyot 
 William Leymergie
 Élise Lucet

M–P

 Noël Mamère
 Bruno Masure
 Yves Mourousi
 Natalie Nougayrède
 Christine Ockrent
 Jean-Pierre Pernaut
 Gabrielle Petit (feminist)
 Patrick Poivre d'Arvor
 David Pujadas
 Audrey Pulvar

Q–Z

 Bernard Rapp
 Colette Reynaud
 Thierry Roland
 Laurent Romejko
 Harry Roselmack
 Jacques Rivette
 Pierre Sabbagh
 Henri Sannier
 Béatrice Schönberg
 Pierre Tchernia, a.k.a. Pierre Tcherniakowski
 Mélissa Theuriau
 Jean-Pierre Thiollet
 Guy Thomas
 Karl Zéro
 Léon Zitrone

External links
 French National Audiovisual Institute (INA) English-language website
 INA history of French journalism website (in French)

 
France
Newsreaders and journalists